Windsor Assembly Plant (WAP) is a Stellantis Canada automobile factory in Windsor, Ontario. The factory opened in 1928 and Chrysler minivans production began in 1983. Windsor Assembly is Windsor's largest employer. The plant currently operates two shifts with over 4,200 employees.

Overview 
The plant was designed by the architectural firm Hutton & Souter. It covers 408,773 square metres (4.4 million sq. ft.) on 50 hectares (123.3 acres) and manufactured the Generation I Dodge Caravan and Plymouth Voyager minivans from 1983 until 1991. The Generation II minivans, constructed on the AS platform was equipped with an optional V6 engine and in a new long wheel-base version.  The Generation III (NS) minivan production began in 1995 — with dual sliding doors.  Starting in July 2000, the Generation IV (RS) minivan, which included the Stow'n Go seating, was produced until July 2007.  In August 2007, the Generation V (RT) minivan was introduced which continues with the Stow 'n Go and features the new Swivel'n Go seating. The current Chrysler Pacifica (RU) minivan, that replaced the Chrysler Town & Country, entered production in 2016 for the 2017 model year and includes both gasoline engine and plug-in hybrid versions.

In March 2019, FCA Canada announced it would cut the third shift at Windsor Assembly, eliminating 1,500 jobs. Although the third shift was initially scheduled to end in September 2019, it was extended multiple times. The third shift finally ended on July 10, 2020.

Production of the Dodge Grand Caravan ended August 21, 2020 as FCA moves retail and fleet customers to the new entry-level Chrysler Voyager and Chrysler Grand Caravan.

Vehicles produced

Current 
Chrysler Pacifica (2017–present)
Chrysler Voyager (2020–present)
Chrysler Grand Caravan (2021–present)

Past 
Windsor Assembly assembled many vehicles before the plant was converted in 1982 for the production of the Minivan. Although the vehicle has had many names under different brands, the minivan has always been built at WAP. A deal with Volkswagen resulted in the plant assembling the Routan (RM) on the same platform as the Dodge Grand Caravan and Chrysler Town & Country models in August 2008. Production lasted until 2013.

With the closure of Windsor Assembly's sister plant, Saint Louis Assembly, in Fenton, Missouri in October 2008, WAP started producing the right-hand drive and diesel versions for the world market in August 2009 for the 2010 model year under the Chrysler nameplate and eventually the Lancia Voyager.

1953–1955 Dodge M37/M43
1959–1960 Chrysler Saratoga
1960–1966 Valiant
1961–1966 Chrysler Windsor
1964–1965 Valiant Barracuda
1967–1976 Dodge Dart
1967–1976 Plymouth Valiant
1975–1978 Dodge Charger
1975–1983 Chrysler Cordoba
1978  Dodge Li'l Red Express Truck
1978–1979 Dodge Magnum
1980–1983 Dodge Mirada
1981      Chrysler LeBaron
1981–1983 Chrysler Imperial
1981–1983 Dodge Diplomat/Plymouth Caravelle/Plymouth Gran Fury
1982–1983 Chrysler New Yorker/Chrysler New Yorker Fifth Avenue
1984–2000 Plymouth Voyager
1984–2007 Dodge Caravan
1987–2000 Plymouth Grand Voyager
1987–2020 Dodge Grand Caravan
1990–2016 Chrysler Town & Country 
2001–2003 Chrysler Voyager
2004–2008 Chrysler Pacifica
2009–2013 Volkswagen Routan
2011–2014 Lancia Voyager
2012–2015 Ram C/V Tradesman

References

External links
 

Chrysler factories
Economy of Windsor, Ontario
Buildings and structures in Windsor, Ontario
Motor vehicle assembly plants in Canada
Manufacturing in Ontario